Orthogonal Time Frequency Space (OTFS) is a 2D modulation technique that transforms the information carried in the Delay-Doppler coordinate system. The information is transformed in the similar time-frequency domain as utilized by the traditional schemes of modulation such as TDMA, CDMA, and OFDM.  It was first used for fixed wireless, and is now a contending waveform for 6G technology due to its robustness in high-speed vehicular scenarios.

OTFS is intimately related to an earlier modulation 2D modulation scheme - called orthogonal short-time Fourier (OSTF) signaling - and is related to it through a 2D discrete Fourier transform. In this regard, OTFS is simply a precoded version of OSTF. Yet, OSTF defines the critical analog-digital interface that is matched to the characteristics of the time-varying wireless channel.



Overview 
OTFS is a modulation scheme where each transmitted symbol experiences a near-constant channel gain even in channels at high carrier frequencies (mm-wave) or with high Doppler. This OTFS signal is well localized in both time and frequency domain. The transmitted signal is in the delay-doppler domain. OTFS waveform remains invariant under the operation of the time and frequency domains. When we transmit an OTFS waveform in the delay-doppler domain, we use the Zak transform. This OTFS will satisfy Heisenberg Uncertainty principle (signal is localized in delay-doppler representation). 

The quantity X[n,m] is precisely in the time-frequency domain of OSTF, which as noted above, is used for transmitting the waveform over the wireless channel. OTFS and OSTF are related through a 2D unitary transform (precoding). However, the choice of the pulse shape in OSTF is critical to this operation of OSTF as well as OTFS.

It effectively transforms the time-varying multipath channel into a 2D channel in the Delay-Doppler domain. Using this transformation, along with equalization within this domain, each symbol experiences similar channel gain throughout the transmission. 

The modulation begins with first mapping the information symbols x[k,l] in the Delay–Doppler domain to symbols X [n, m] for creating the time-domain signal s(t) which is transmitted over a wireless channel. At the receiver end, the time-domain signal r(t) is mapped to the domain of time-frequency using the Wigner transform which is the inverse of Heisenberg transform and then for symbol demodulation uses the Delay–Doppler domain.

The technology has been used in 5G networks and is being considered for 6G networks.

Channel Equalization and Estimation 
Low complexity equalization has been proposed based on Message Passing (MP), Markov Chain Monte Carlo (MCMC), and Linear equalization methods. The diversity of OTFS modulation has been studied in. Channel estimation pilots are transmitted in the delay Doppler domain. The performance of OTFS modulation in static multi-path channels has also been studied.

Practical Pulse Shaping Waveforms 
It is impossible to transmit an ideal pulse shape due to the time-frequency uncertainty principle.   This motivated some works for practical pulse shaped OTFS systems.

Pulsone 
A pulsone (stands for pulse + tone) is the time realization of a quasi-periodic pulse in delay-Doppler and it serves as the carrier waveform of the OTFS modulation format. Of particular interest are pulsones in the crystalline regime (when the periods are greater than the spread of the channel). In this regime, the pulsone remains invariant under the operations of time delay and Doppler shift which results with non-fading and predictable channel interaction, rendering pulsones ideal for mobility and machine learning applications.

Application 
OTFS offers several advantages in particular environments where the dispersion is at high frequency. Environments such as these are encountered in mm-wave systems, due to both larger Doppler spreads and higher phase noise. Application of OTFS waveforms for Radio Detection and Ranging (RADAR) have also been proposed recently.

Patents 
The idea for OTFS was first patented in 2010 by Ronny Hadani and Shlomo Rakib and transferred to Cohere Technologies Inc in 2011. In December 2022, during the inaugural 6G Evolution Summit event opening keynote, Fierce Wireless moderator referred to Hadani as “The Father of OTFS.”

The idea for OTFS is inspired by OSTF (orthogonal short-time Fourier) signaling originally developed in 2004 (K. Liu, T. Kadous, and A. Sayeed, Orthogonal Time-Frequency Signaling Over Doubly Dispersive Channels, IEEE Transactions on Information Theory, pp. 2583-2603, Nov. 2004.) The intimate connection between OSTF and OTFS is further discussed in A. Sayeed, How is Time Frequency Space Modulation Related to Short Time Fourier Signaling?, IEEE Globecom 2021, Dec. 7-11, 2021, Madrid. arXiv:2109.06047.

References 

Channel access methods
https://amsayeed.files.wordpress.com/2021/09/otfs_vs_stf_gcom21_final.pdf A. Sayeed, How is Time Frequency Space Modulation Related to Short Time Fourier Signaling?, IEEE Globecom 2021, Dec. 7-11, 2021, Madrid. arXiv:2109.06047.

https://amsayeed.files.wordpress.com/2021/09/otfs_vs_stf_gcom21_final.pdf K. Liu, T. Kadous, and A. Sayeed, Orthogonal Time-Frequency Signaling Over Doubly Dispersive Channels, IEEE Transactions on Information Theory, pp. 2583-2603, Nov. 2004.